Graham Edward Moore  (January 18, 1899 – February 10, 1976) was an American professional baseball player who played second base and outfield from 1923 to 1934 in the Major Leagues.

Baseball career
Moore nearly usurped Pie Traynor's job as the starting third baseman for the Pittsburgh Pirates in 1924, his rookie season. Traynor, mired in a terrible slump, was benched on June 18, and Moore batted .423 in his first 13 games at the position. On the strength of this performance, manager Bill McKechnie declared Moore to be his starter going forward. However, Moore was hit by a pitch from Johnny Stuart of the St. Louis Cardinals on July 1, suffering a dislocated shoulder, and Traynor took advantage of Moore's absence to re-solidify his hold on the position.

The next season, after Rabbit Maranville was traded to the Chicago Cubs, Moore became the Pirates' starting second baseman. He injured his shoulder on May 8, but was forced back into the lineup at less than full strength after only a few days of rest because the father of his backup, Johnny Rutledge, had died unexpectedly.

Moore was sold to the Boston Braves in 1926, after a confrontation with Fred Clarke, who was then working as the Pirates' assistant manager and head of scouting. The trouble began during a doubleheader against the New York Giants on July 12. Moore committed an error in the first game, and was booed by the crowd. He had a habit of reflexively smiling during moments of stress, and when Clarke saw his grin, he took it to be a sign that Moore did not care about what he was doing. The two got into a shouting match in the dugout after the end of the inning, with Moore telling Clarke to "get off the bench". That game was Moore's last with the Pirates. That evening, McKechnie fined Moore and pitcher Emil Yde for what he termed "indifferent play", and on July 20 the team sold Moore to the Braves.

On September 27, 1930, Moore became the last major-league player to hit a "bounce" home run. (Prior to the 1931 season, a ball that bounced from the field of play into the outfield stands was considered a home run.)

Moore helped lead the New Orleans Pelicans to a Southern Association championship in 1933, batting .309 as the team's starting shortstop.

in 748 games over 10 seasons in his major league career, Moore posted a .285 batting average (706-for-2474) with 360 runs, 108 doubles, 26 triples, 13 home runs, 257 RBI, 52 stolen bases, 272 bases on balls, .359 on-base percentage and .366 slugging percentage. He finished his career with an overall .953 fielding percentage. In the 1925 World Series, he hit .231 (6-for-26) with 7 runs, 1 double, 1 home run, 2 RBI and 5 walks.

References

 http://www.baseball-almanac.com/players/player.php?p=mooreed01
 http://www.gousfbulls.com/pdf8/670823.pdf
 https://web.archive.org/web/20110428025340/http://www.scottsaddition.com/images/Newsletter_9_09.pdf

External links

1899 births
1976 deaths
Major League Baseball second basemen
Major League Baseball outfielders
Brooklyn Robins players
Pittsburgh Pirates players
Boston Braves players
New York Giants (NL) players
Cleveland Indians players
Baseball players from Kentucky
Atlanta Crackers managers
Minor league baseball managers
Atlanta Crackers players
St. Petersburg Saints players
Oakland Oaks (baseball) players
Montreal Royals players
New Orleans Pelicans (baseball) players
Savannah Indians players
Syracuse Chiefs players
Spartanburg Spartans players
Baltimore Orioles (IL) players
Winston-Salem Twins players
Gainesville G-Men players